Limitryu Tupaq Yupanki (Spanish Demetrio Túpac Yupanqui Martínez) (22 December 1923 – 3 May 2018) was a Peruvian Quechua language professor (or more accurate Southern Quechua), a translator from Castilian to Quechua and journalist.

He went to Lima, where he studied Philosophy at the Pontifical Catholic University of Peru, and then Law at the National University of San Marcos. He worked in the newspaper La Prensa, and began teaching Quechua. Subsequently, he opened his own academy, Yachay Wasi. He also taught in the United States.

In November 2005, thanks to his work, the Quechua translation of the Spanish classic Don Quixote de la Mancha was finally published with the name Yachay sapa wiraqucha dun Qvixote Manchamantan

In 2008, his work The Quechua Course was translated into Russian by A. Skromnitsky.
He died on May 3, 2018.

References

External links
 eltiempo.com: Peruano Túpac Yupanqui logró que Microsoft lanzara sistema operativo de Windows traducido al quechua
 El Quijote en quechua in web Club de Traductores Literarios de Buenos Aires.

1923 births
2018 deaths
People from Cusco
Peruvian philosophers
20th-century Peruvian lawyers
Pontifical Catholic University of Peru alumni
National University of San Marcos alumni
Quechua-language writers
Peruvian translators
Translators to Quechua
20th-century translators
Translators of Don Quixote